Fire All Your Guns at Once is a 1996 EP by Magnapop released in the United Kingdom by Play It Again Sam Records on Compact Disc (catalogue number 450.0287.22 - BIAS 287 CD) and 7" gramophone record (450.0287.40 - BIAS 287-7.) In the United States, it was issued by SideOneDummy Records on purple vinyl (603967000979) on April 1, 1998, and as a promotional Compact Disc by Priority Records (DPRO 30039) in 1996. Two of these tracks are also featured on their studio album Rubbing Doesn't Help.

Reception
The EP received favorable reviews from the College Music Journal, Melody Maker, and Metro Silicon Valley.

Track listing
All songs written by Linda Hopper and Ruthie Morris
"Come on Inside" – 2:58
"Hold You Down" – 3:14
"Voice Without a Sound" – 2:41
"Down on Me" – 3:18

Personnel
Magnapop
Linda Hopper – lead vocals
Ruthie Morris – guitar, backing vocals
Shannon Mulvaney – bass guitar

Additional personnel
Jerry Finn – mixing on "Come on Inside"
Josh Freese – drums
Geza X – production
Eddie Shryer of Future Disc – mastering
Steve Snow – sound design on "Come On Inside"

References

External links

Fire All Your Guns at Once at Discogs

1996 EPs
Albums produced by Geza X
Magnapop EPs
PIAS Recordings EPs
Priority Records EPs
SideOneDummy Records EPs